Preller is a surname derived from Middle High German brellen 'to yell', 'to bawl.' Also derived from Preller (Bruller), one who shouts or roars, i.e. a Town Crier. Notable people with the surname include:

A. J. Preller (born 1977), former MLB scout and the current GM of San Diego Padres
Fred W. Preller (1902–1974), New York assemblyman
Friedrich Preller the Elder (1804–1878), German landscape painter
Friedrich Preller the Younger (1838–1903), German painter
Gustav Preller (1875–1943), South African journalist and historian
James Preller (1961–), American author
Johann Gottlieb Preller (1727–1786), German composer
Ludwig Preller (1809–1861), German philologist and antiquarian